This is a list of awards and nominations received by the South Korean pop group g.o.d. The group debuted in 1999 before going on hiatus from 2006 to 2014.

Golden Disc Awards (GDA)

Mnet Asian Music Awards (MAMA)

Melon Music Awards (MMA)

Seoul Music Awards (SMA)

Gaon Chart Music Awards

KBS Music Awards
The KBS Music Awards were discontinued from 2005 and reformatted into the current KBS Song Festival.

SBS Music Awards
The SBS Music Awards were discontinued in 2007 and reformatted into the SBS Gayo Daejeon.

MBC Music Awards
The MBC Music Awards were discontinued in 2005 and reformatted into the MBC Gayo Daejejeon.

MTV Asia Awards

MTV Video Music Awards (MTV VMA)

Other awards

Notes

References

Awards
g